Minuscule 81 (in the Gregory-Aland numbering), or α162 (in the Soden numbering) is a Greek minuscule manuscript of the New Testament, on a parchment. It is dated by a colophon to the year 1044. Formerly it was labelled by 61a and 61p (Gregory). The manuscript is lacunose. It was adapted for liturgical use.

Description 

The codex contains almost complete text of the Acts of the Apostles and the Epistles on 282 parchment leaves, with some lacunae (Acts 4:8-7:17; 17:28-23:9 - 297 verses). The text is written in one column per page, in 23 lines per page, in small letters.

Lectionary markings were added on the margin by a later hand (for liturgical use).

Text 

The Greek text of the codex, is a representative of the Alexandrian text-type, with some the Byzantine readings. It is one of the most important of all minuscule manuscripts. It was only one minuscule manuscript examined by Constantin von Tischendorf. Aland placed it in "at least Category II".

It has been called "the best minuscule witness to Acts" or "the most important minuscule copy of the Acts". F. H. A. Scrivener stated "its value is shown not so much by the readings in which it stands alone, as by agreement with the oldest uncial copies, where their testimonies coincide".

In Acts 16:10 it reads θεος along with P74, Sinaiticus, Alexandrinus, Vaticanus, Ephraemi, E, 044, 33, 181, 326, 630, 945, 1739, ar, e, l, vg, copbo, geo; other reading κυριος, is supported by D, P, 049, 056, 0142, 88, 104, 330, 436, 451, 614, 629, 1241, 1505, 1877, 2127, 2412, 2492, 2495, Byz, c, d, gig, syrp,h, copsa.

It does not contain text of Acts 28:29.

In Romans 8:1 it reads Ιησου κατα σαρκα περιπατουσιν, for Ιησου (as א, B, D, G, 1739, 1881, itd, g, copsa, bo, eth). The reading of the manuscript is supported by A, Db, Ψ, 629, 2127, vg. The Byzantine manuscripts read Ιησου μη κατα σαρκα περιπατουσιν αλλα κατα πνευμα.

In Romans 13:9 it has additional phrase ου ψευδομαρτυρησεις, the reading is supported by the manuscripts: א (P) 048 104 365 1506 a b vgcl (syrh) copbo.

Romans 16:24 is omitted as in Codex Sinaiticus A B C 5 263 623 1739 1838 1962 2127 itz vgww copsa,bo ethro Origenlat).

In 1 Corinthians 2:1 it reads μαρτυριον along with B D G P Ψ 33 104 181 326 330 451 614 629 630 1241 1739 1877 1881 1962 1984 2127 2492 2495 Byz Lect it vg syrh copsa arm eth. Other manuscripts read μυστηριον or σωτηριον.

In 1 Corinthians 7:5 it reads τη προσευχη (prayer) along with 𝔓11, 𝔓46, א*, A, B, C, D, F, G, P, Ψ, 6, 33, 104, 181, 629, 630, 1739, 1877, 1881, 1962, it vg, cop, arm, eth. Other manuscripts read τη νηστεια και τη προσευχη (fasting and prayer) or τη προσευχη και νηστεια (prayer and fasting).

In 1 Timothy 3:16 it has textual variant  (God manifested) (Sinaiticuse, A2, C2, Dc, K, L, P, 044, 81, 104, 181, 326, 330, 436, 451, 614, 629, 630, 1241, 1739, 1877, 1881, 1962, 1984, 1985, 2492, 2495, Byz, Lect), against ὃς ἐφανερώθη (he was manifested) supported by Sinaiticus, Codex Alexandrinus, Ephraemi, Boernerianus, 33, 365, 442, 2127, ℓ 599.

In 2 Timothy 4:10 it reads Γαλλιαν, along with Sinaiticus C 104 326 436; other manuscript read Γαλατιαν (A D F G K L P Ψ 33 88 181 330 451 614 629 630 1241 1739 1877 1881 1962 1984 1985 2127 2492 2495 Byz Lect) or Γαλιλαιαν (copbo).

In Hebrews 8:11 it reads πλησιον for πολιτην, the reading is supported by Codex Porphyrianus, 104, 436, 629, 630, and 1985.

In 1 John 5:6 it has textual variant δι' ὕδατος καὶ πνεύματος καὶ αἵματος (through water and spirit and blood) together with the manuscripts: Codex Porphyrianus, 88, 442, 630, 915, 2492, arm, eth Bart D. Ehrman identified it as Orthodox corrupt reading.

History 

According to the colophon, it was written on April 20, 1044, by a scribe named John at the request of another monk, named Jakob.

The codex was discovered by Constantin von Tischendorf in Egypt in 1853, who took 57 leaves of the codex (Acts of the Apostles) with himself. He sold it to the Trustees of the British Museum in 1854. Now it is located in the British Library (Add MS 20003) in London. 225 leaves are still in Alexandria, where they are held in the Patriarchat Library (59).

Formerly it was labelled by 61a and 61p (Gregory). In 1908 C. R. Gregory gave for it number 81.

Tischendorf collated and published text of it in 1854 (Anecdota sacra). C. R. Gregory saw it in 1883.

See also 

 List of New Testament minuscules
 Textual criticism
 Biblical manuscript

Notes

References

Further reading 

 F. H. A. Scrivener, An Exact Transcript of the Codex Augiensis (Cambridge and London, 1859), pp. 68–70.
 Constantin von Tischendorf, Anecdota sacra et profana (Lipsiae 1855), pp. 130–146.

External links 
 
 Minuscule 81 at the Encyclopedia of Textual Criticism

Greek New Testament minuscules
11th-century biblical manuscripts
British Library additional manuscripts